Scatterville is a former unincorporated community in Clay County, Arkansas, United States, approximately 2 mi (3 km) northwest of Rector.  All that is left of the community today is a cemetery. The community occupied a strategic location along Crowley's Ridge and was often referred to in the reports of Union and Confederate forces vying for control of Northeast Arkansas during the American Civil War.

History

Scatterville was one of the first Clay County communities, defined by having five or six families settled in a five-mile (8 km) area. Scatterville received its name because:
. . . one man put a store at the foot of a hill, another put one at the peak, still another put one at the foot on the other side.  The few stores and cabins were scattered about over the hills in a careless way.

The first families to locate in the Scatterville community were the McNiels, Allens, Copelands, Mobleys, Snowdens, Waddells, Nortens, Mitchells, Golbys, Whites, Bradshaws, Deans, Rayburns, Whitakers, and Simmons.  They were mainly subsistence farmers; however, the Allen, Knight, Simmon, Bradshaw, McNiel, and Mobley families brought a few slaves with them when they emigrated from Kentucky and Tennessee.  Cotton was grown during the antebellum period, but it was only used to make clothing for personal use. A gin in Scatterville eased this task somewhat by removing the seeds from the boll. After the war, cotton was raised as a cash crop. In 1855, the first horse-powered sawmill was brought to Scatterville, and a frame school building was erected in 1859. In that same year the town welcomed Major Rayburn's new steam-powered sawmill. Other industries in Scatterville included a tanyard for shoe making and a hand-powered sorghum mill.

Civil War
During the American Civil War, both Union and Confederate forces operated in the area.

On March 23, 1862, Union Col. John McNiel reported that "There are about 1,000 men at Gainesville and Scatterville, on Crowleys Ridge. They are badly armed and scattered, in order to subsist."

On March 24, 1863, Union Col. John McNiel reported that "From 400 to 700 of Jeffers and Clarks men are scattered along from Chalk Bluff to Scatterville and Gainesville."

On March 28, 1863, a detachment of the 1st Wisconison Cavalry Regiment passed through Scatterville in pursuit of a Confederate force under Col Preston, said to be in the area with 400 men.

On July 21, 1863, Confederate Colonel S. G. Kitchens of the 10th Missouri Cavalry reported that a Union force of 350 was camped three miles south of Scatterville.

On July 22, 1863, Confederate Colonel S. G. Kittchens again reported that the enemy (Union) had appeared in force in the neighborhood of Scatterville.

On January 6, 1864, Union Colonel J. B. Rogers, reported that "Williams Guerillas" were operating near Scatterville.

On May 21, 1864,  Captain H. J. Huiskamp of the Sixth Missouri Cavalry, (Union) reported, "On our return, and while in camp near Scatterville, Ark., Captain Johns was shot by guerrillas, a ball passing through and shattering his left arm. He was also wounded in the hip." .

On March 5, 1864, Union Captain T. W. Leeper reported that Confederate Col S. G. Kitchens was at Scatterville and "has returned from General Price and ordered all these scattered bands to report to him, and that they have gone."

In June 1864, Union Brigadier General Ewing reported that Confederate Col Kitchens was at Scatterville with 300 men and that he was still recruiting.

Union Col. John T. Burris reported a skirmish at Scatterville on July 7, 1864, with Bolin's Band and Kitchen's men.  Burris reported the casualties as 4 Confederate dead and 1 Union wounded.

Union Col John T Burris, of the 10th Kansas Volunteer Cavalry reported that a skirmish occurred at Scatterville which resulted in the burning of houses in Scatterville.  Burris had under his command a battalion of the Second Cavalry, Missouri Militia, a detachment of the 1st Missouri Volunteer Cavalry and a detachment of the First Cavalry Missouri Volunteers.  Burris indicates that his command reached Scatterville on 28 July 1864 and
There we routed a rebel recruiting party, under Colonel Clark, and had a skirmish with Bolins guerrillas. We killed 1 rebel lieutenant, took Captain Lineback prisoner, captured some arms and horses, and burned the houses, under cover of which the guerrillas had fired on my command. No casualties on our side, except the wounding of E. T. Jenkins, chief scout

Scatterville Cemetery 

As there are no known structures surviving from that period in the Scatterville vicinity, the Scatterville Cemetery is locally significant as the best surviving link to this important early Clay County settlement which faded from view in the post-railroad era. The Scatterville Cemetery comprises roughly two acres and is set in an impressive stand of largely oak and hickory trees. The cemetery is surrounded on three sides by a barbed-wire fence of indeterminate age, and is further designated by a large cast-iron marker erected at the entrance by the Arkansas History Commission in 1973.

Most of the markers are small, narrow marble slabs, many of which have fallen and/or possibly moved. The inscriptions on many gravestones have been obscured by age and the elements while others were never inscribed. There are a few styled markers, including two four-sided family monuments with obelisks belonging to the Allen and McNiel families. Both were damaged by vandals; the Allen monument has been repaired, while the McNiel obelisk is lying in two parts beside its base. Nearby, the largest gravestone in the cemetery, the square-based, shaft and capital monument to Nancy McNiel, is in worse condition with its shaft lying on the ground and its capital broken into several pieces.  There is also a multiple gravestone for three members of the Cook family. It is a tall rectangular monument with an upper-sloped face featuring a sculpted open Bible. Other interesting stones include H. W. Granade's 1870 horizontal cylindrical marker and Captain W. T. Morris's 1902 rectangular monument on base with an open Bible and a knotted stole draped down one side.

Although there is an unsubstantiated story regarding a grave in the southeast corner in which twenty Civil War soldiers are buried, there is no mention of slaves being buried here. It is known that some are buried at the nearby Mobley family cemetery.

The only non-historic component of the cemetery is a dedication marker of pink granite atop a concrete base that is inscribed:
"The privilege of caring for this forest shrine was accepted by the Methodist Youth Fellowship of Rector in 1963. We bequeath its perpetual care to our successors."

References

Bibliography
Dalton, O. L.;  "Old Scatterville Cemetery Has Been Adopted."  Clay County Democrat, August 8, 1963.
Dalton, O. L.;  "Scatterville Cemetery Gravestones." Clay County Democrat, August 15, 1963.
Webb, Robert T.;  History & Traditions of Clay County.  Little Rock, Arkansas:  Parke-Harper Co., 1933 (reprinted in the Piggott Times, April 29, 1982.).

Unincorporated communities in Clay County, Arkansas
Unincorporated communities in Arkansas
Populated places established in 1855
1855 establishments in Arkansas